Thangamani Rangamani is a Tamil film, directed by Ramanarayanan. Murali and S. Ve. Shekher are, with  S. S. Chandran, Kovai Sarala, Pallavi and Devisri in supporting roles. It is an unofficial remake of the 1984 Malayalam movie Poochakkoru Mookkuthi.

Plot
Thangamani and Rangamani are close friends. Rangamani, an unemployed youth, is in love with Meena, the daughter of a rich man. Thangamani is the son of a leading lawyer, who is also the legal advisor to Sivagangai Gopalakrishnan, who is a successful businessman.

Rangamani wants to marry Meena and settle down in life. Rangamani lies to Meena's father that he is the son of Sivagangai Gopalakrishnan and gets engaged to her. Thangamani comes across Lakshmi and falls in love with her. He misunderstands Lakshmi to be Sivagangai Gopalakrishnan's daughter. Much confusion follows and the film follows Rangamani and Thangamani's love story.

Cast
 S. Ve. Shekher as Thangamani
 Murali as Rangamani
 Pallavi as Lakshmi
 Devisri as Meena
 S. S. Chandran as Sivagangai Gopalakrishnan
 Kovai Sarala as Sivagangai Gopalakrishnan's wife
 Vennira Aadai Moorthy as Lawyer and Thangamani's father
 Bailvaan Ranganathan as Meena's father
 Charlie as Watchman Kannayeeram
 Thyagu
 Gandhimathi as Thangamani's mother
 Kullamani as Photographer

Soundtrack
Soundtrack was composed by Shankar–Ganesh.
"Va Va" - Malaysia Vasudevan, S. P. Sailaja
"Sembaruthi" - S. P. Balasubrahmanyam, K. S. Chithra
"Pora" - TKS Natrajan
"Rail Pola" - Mano
"Thangamani" - Shankar

References

1989 films
1980s Tamil-language films
Films directed by Rama Narayanan
Films scored by Shankar–Ganesh